Md. Abul Kalam (মোঃ আবুল কালাম) is a Bangladesh Awami League politician and the incumbent Member of Parliament from Natore-1.

Early life
Kalam was born on 25 July 1956. He has a B.A., M.A., and LLB degree.

Career
Kalam was elected to Parliament from Natore-1 on 5 January 2014 as a Bangladesh Awami League candidate.

References

Awami League politicians
Living people
1956 births
10th Jatiya Sangsad members